Snuffer is the third EP by New York City noise rock band Live Skull, released in 1988 by Caroline Records.

Track listing

Personnel 
Adapted from the Snuffer liner notes.

Live Skull
 Mark C. – guitar, vocals, photography
 Marnie Greenholz – bass guitar, vocals
 Richard Hutchins – drums
 Tom Paine – guitar, vocals
 Thalia Zedek – vocals

Production and additional personnel
 Martin Bisi – mixing
 Live Skull – production, mixing

Release history

References

External links 
 

1988 EPs
Caroline Records EPs
Live Skull albums